Chamchamal is a town located in Sulaymaniyah Governorate, Kurdistan Region, Iraq. Controlled by Kurdistan, it is the town which is nearest located to the disputed territories of Northern Iraq. Chamchamal is home to the Gorani-speaking Hamawand tribe.

Population and location 
The city is a 30 minutes drive east from Kirkuk and an hour west of Sulaymaniyah. The population was 58,000 in 2003. The population in 2018 was 65,300 people, including Arabs.

History
The city has a historic citadel, and early Western observers of the region speculated that it has been inhabited since the Sassanid period. The Chamchamal valley is also home to important paleolithic sites of Jarmo and Zarzi.

Climate

Notable people 
 
 
Thanun Pyriadi (born 1933), chemist, from Ali Mansour village

See also 
Garmekan (Sasanian province located in modern-day Kurdistan Region of Iraq)
Garmian Region
Beth Garmai

References

Cities in Iraqi Kurdistan
Populated places in Sulaymaniyah Province
District capitals of Iraq
Kurdish settlements in Iraq